Hewitt Lake National Wildlife Refuge is a  National Wildlife Refuge in the northern region of the U.S. state of Montana. This refuge is a part of the Bowdoin Wetland Management District (WMD), and is unstaffed. The refuge is partly owned by the U.S. Government, while the rest is an easement with local landowners. The refuge is managed from Bowdoin National Wildlife Refuge.

References

External links

 Hewitt Lake National Wildlife Refuge

National Wildlife Refuges in Montana
Easement refuges
Protected areas of Phillips County, Montana
Protected areas established in 1938
1938 establishments in Montana